The SOCIMI AR-831 is an assault rifle of Italian origin based on the AR-15. The weapon is gas operated and is chambered in the 5.56×45mm NATO round.

See also
 Daewoo K2, another M16/AK derivative
 List of assault rifles

References

External links
 http://www.securityarms.com/20010315/galleryfiles/2900/2917.htm
 http://www.earmi.it/armi/atlas2/707.htm - Picture

5.56 mm assault rifles
Rifles of Italy
ArmaLite AR-10 derivatives